is a manufacturer of women's lingerie and underwear, founded in 1949 in Japan by Koichi Tsukamoto. The company has divisions in North America and Europe, and manufactures the brands Wacoal, b.tempt'd, Elomi, Eveden, Fantasie, Freya, Lively, and Goddess.

Company history
In 1964, Wacoal established the Human Science Research Center to conduct scientific research on women's beauty, health, and bodies for product development.

In 1985, Wacoal launched in America. To encourage potential customers to purchase the new brand despite the higher prices than its competitors, Wacoal's fit experts partnered with sales associates in department stores across the country to educate consumers about the fit and quality of Wacoal products. Wacoal was named the best-selling bra in American department stores in 2005. In 2009, Wacoal launched b.tempt'd, an intimate apparel brand aimed toward younger consumers.

In 2012, Wacoal acquired the Eveden Group, a UK-based lingerie manufacturer founded in 1920, bringing the full-figure brands Freya, Elomi, Fantasie, and Goddess under its corporate umbrella.

Brand portfolio
 Wacoal, flagship brand, launched in 1949 in Japan and 1985 in the United States
 b.tempt'd, junior brand (sizes 30AA–38E), launched in 2009 worldwide
 Elomi, launched 2008 in the UK by Eveden Group, full-figure bras and swimwear (34 bands and up, D through K cup)
 Eveden, launched 1920 in the UK
 Fantasie, full-figure bras and swimwear, formerly produced by Eveden Group
 Freya, launched 1998 in the UK by Eveden Group, large-bust bras and swimwear up to K cup and sports bras and swimwear up to H cup
 Goddess, launched in the US and acquired in 2002 by Eveden Group, full-figure bras and swimwear

Product manufacturing
Wacoal products are manufactured almost entirely by hand. Much of the production occurs at Wacoal Vietnam, a manufacturing location established in 1997.

Philanthropic efforts
Wacoal launched a bra in 1999 known as the Awareness Bra, which features a pink ribbon on each band to remind women to be conscious of their breast health. In 2001, the Fit for the Cure campaign was launched to raise funds for breast cancer awareness and research. Wacoal donates to Susan G. Komen for every woman who participates in a complimentary fitting during Fit for the Cure.

References

External links
 
 Wacoal America
 Wacoal Europe (Eveden, Fantasie, Freya, Goddess)

 
Clothing companies established in 1949
Retail companies established in 1949
Japanese brands
Lingerie brands
Companies based in Kyoto
Japanese companies established in 1949
Companies listed on the Tokyo Stock Exchange
Clothing brands of Japan